Amir Benayoun (Hebrew: עמיר בניון) (born on August 30, 1975) is an Israeli singer-songwriter.

Biography
Amir Benayoun was born in Beersheba to Maxim and Esther Benayoun who moved to Israel from Algeria. His father was an oud player. From a very young age he showed great interest in music, playing with his father and his brother. While devoting himself to songwriting, he made a living working in home repair jobs. He was turned away from serving in the IDF because of a drug problem.

Benayoun is a second cousin of Yossi Benayoun. In November 2005 he married Miryam Golan, an Israeli poet and musician. The couple have two children. They divorced in 2018.

Music career
In 1999 Benayoun released his first album, "Rak Ath" (Only You), selling 40,000 copies. Shortly after it came the second album, and in 2002 his third, "Shalechet" (Fall), was a big hit, establishing Benayoun in the mainstream of Israeli music.

Additionally, he wrote and composed songs for other artists, such as Gidi Gov and Gali Atari and Yehoram Gaon.

In 2011, Benayoun created an album in Arabic called "Zini" to support the people in the Syrian uprising.

In 2012 he began to include in his Albums parts of his wife's poetry. The artistic collaboration between the two maintained until their divorce.

Awards and recognition
In 2006, Benayoun won an ACUM prize for his song, "Nitzacht Iti Hakol" but he refused to accept it and donated it instead.

Controversy
In November 2014, the President of Israel, Reuven Rivlin cancelled a scheduled performance by Benayoun at the president's official residence, after the latter released a song reacting to a deadly terror attack on a synagogue in Jerusalem on November 18. The lyric described a terrorist dreaming of murdering Jews, and a wave of controversy arose in reaction to its circulation. A poll by Channel 2 News suggested 42% of Israelis concur with the song's sentiments. Meretz MK Issawi Frej  has requested that the singer be investigated on incitement charges. However, Benayoun was not investigated and President Reuven Rivlin was severely criticized for his decision, also by MP Uri Orbach who stated he will not attend the event at the president's official residence if Benayoun's performance will not take place as planned.

Discography

Albums
 Rak At (רק את - Only You) 1999
 Oto Makom, Ota Haruach (אותו מקום אותה הרוח - The Same Place, the Same Spirit) 1999
 Shalechet (שלכת - Fall) 2002
 Nitzacht Iti Hakol (ניצחת איתי הכל - You Won Everything with Me) 2004
 Hakol Ad Lecan (הכל עד לכאן - Everything until Here) 2006
 Aluf Beshachor (אלוף בשחור - Champion in Black) 2007
 Omed Basha'ar (עומד בשער - Standing at the Gate) 2008
 Machshavot - with Yehuda Masas (מחשבות - Thoughts) 2010
 Lada'at Hakol (לדעת הכל - To Know Everything) 2010
 Etz Al Mayim (עץ על מים - Tree On Water) 2012
 Shirei Eretz Ahava (שירי ארץ אהבה - Songs of a Land of Love) 2013
 Sufa (סופה - Storm) 2015
 Milah Baruach (מילה ברוח - A Word in the Wind), 2016
 ** "ch" is pronounced kh**

Compilations
 Sha'a Shel Or (שעה של אור - Hour of Light) 2009

Mini albums
 Hamiklat (המקלט - The Shelter) 2011
 Zini 2011 (in Arabic)

See also
Music of Israel

References

External links
About Amir Benayoun in the website of "Nevel Asor" (his record label)(in Hebrew)

1975 births
Living people
20th-century Israeli Jews
21st-century Israeli Jews
Jewish Israeli musicians
Israeli male singer-songwriters
Musicians from Beersheba
Israeli people of Moroccan-Jewish descent
20th-century Israeli male singers
21st-century Israeli male singers